Corrigan may refer to:
Corrigan (surname), a surname of Irish origin
Corrigan, Texas, a town in Polk County, Texas, United States
Corrigan-Camden High School
Corrigan House, a home in Sarasota, Florida which is listed on the United States National Register of Historic Places
Corrigan, a fictional town from Jasper Jones by Craig Silvey

See also
 Currigan
 Korrigan
 Justice Corrigan (disambiguation)